Jesse Espo (born 5 September 1995) is a Finnish professional ice hockey player who played for JHT Kalajoki in Finnish Suomi-Sarja. He was also previously played for KooKoo in the Finnish Liiga.

His brother Jere plays in same team.

References 

Finnish ice hockey left wingers
Living people
1995 births
KooKoo players
People from Kotka
Sportspeople from Kymenlaakso